Swagatika Rath (born 2 November 1994) is an Indian cricketer. She plays for Odisha women's cricket team and Railways women's cricket team in domestic matches. She made her Women's One Day International and Women's Twenty20 International debut against Bangladesh in 2013.

Early life 
Rath was born in 1994 in Jaipur, Rajasthan to Bijaya Kumar Rath and Kunjalata Rath who were from Jasotikiri, Bhadrak district, Odisha.

References

External links 
 

1994 births
Living people
People from Bhadrak district
Cricketers from Odisha
Sportswomen from Odisha
Odisha women cricketers
East Zone women cricketers
Indian women cricketers
India women One Day International cricketers
India women Twenty20 International cricketers
Cricketers from Jaipur
21st-century Indian women
21st-century Indian people